The Voice Kids is a British television music competition to find new singing talent. The first series began airing on 10 June 2017, being broadcast on a weekly basis on ITV. It is hosted by Emma Willis and the coaches are will.i.am, Pixie Lott and Danny Jones. In the premiere series, Jess Folley won the competition and Pixie Lott was the winning coach.

Coaches
In early 2016, along with the announcement that The Voice UK would move to ITV for three years, it was announced that  The Voice Kids had been ordered for two series. The winner will receive £30,000 and a family trip to Disneyland Paris. Unlike the adult version, there will be no knockouts rounds. When it was previously reported that the adult version's sixth series would feature five live shows (which turned out to be the usual three), reports claimed that there would be three live shows; there will only be one.

In July 2016, it was announced that adult show coach will.i.am would also be a coach on The Voice Kids. On 15 November 2016, it was announced Pixie Lott and Danny Jones from McFly would be coaches along with will.i.am. Of this announcement, Pixie Lott commented, "I can’t wait to join The Voice Kids and help discover the next big star. I have such a passion for talented young people and I know the UK will have lots – I can’t wait to hear them! I’m looking forward to getting started and working alongside my fellow coaches will.i.am and Danny Jones." Jones stated, "I'm pumped about joining The Voice Kids team. There are so many talented kids out there, they just need to be heard and this is a great platform for them. I’m looking forward to finding some fresh talent and coaching them. You never know, there might be a mini McFly out there!" and will.i.am said, "Doing The Voice Kids with Pixie and Danny is going to be dope and I'm really excited to discover just how talented British kids can be." On the same day it was confirmed that Emma Willis will host the show and that Cel Spellman will host the spin-off show The V Room. On 20 May 2017 the trailer for the first series was released.

Teams

Colour key:
  Winner
  Finalist
  Eliminated in the Semi-final
  Eliminated in the Battles

Blind auditions
The open-auditions application for the first series closed on 2 September 2016, with the age limit being 7–14 years old. The show began staging producers' audition days in August 2016 across the United Kingdom., with the blind auditions beginning filming in December 2016.

Each coach has the length of the artists' performance to decide if they want that artist on their team. Should two or more coaches want the same artist, then the artist will choose their coach.

Colour key

Episode 1 (10 June)
The series premiered on 10 June aired from 7.45pm until 9.15pm BST.

Episode 2 (17 June)
The second episode aired from 7.30pm until 9.00pm.

Episode 3 (24 June)
The third episode aired from 7.30pm until 9.00pm.

Episode 4 (1 July)
The fourth episode aired from 7.30pm until 9.00pm.

Battle rounds
Both battle rounds were held on Saturday 8/Sunday 9 July from 7.30pm until 9pm.

Colour key

Episode 1 (8 July)

Episode 2 (9 July)

Show details

Results summary
Team's colour key
 Team Will
 Team Pixie
 Team Danny

Result's colour key
 Artist received the most public votes
 Artist was eliminated 
 Finalist

Semi-final (15 July)
The semi final aired from 7.30pm until 9.30pm.

Final (16 July)
The live final aired from 7.10pm until 9.00pm. This episode determined the winner of the £30,000 cash prize for his/her musical future and a family holiday to Disneyland Paris.

 Group performances: Team Danny with Danny Jones ("Shine a Light"), Team Pixie with Pixie Lott ("Boys and Girls"), Team Will with will.i.am ("I Gotta Feeling")
Musical guests: Niall Horan ("Slow Hands") and The Vamps ("Middle of the Night")

References

External links 

The Voice UK
2017 British television seasons